Ritjaw is a village in Chipwi Township, in the Myitkyina District of Kachin State in north-eastern Burma.

References

External links
Satellite map at Maplandia.com

Populated places in Kachin State
Chipwi Township